The Lewis Mausoleum is a historic mausoleum in Jacksonville, Florida. It is located in Memorial Cemetery, at the junction of Edgewood Avenue and Moncreif Road. On October 24, 1997, it was added to the U.S. National Register of Historic Places.

The mausoleum is the resting place of Abraham Lincoln Lewis (1865-1947), a Florida pioneer and prominent businessman in the African-American community. Lewis was co-founder of Afro-American Life, an early provider of insurance services to African-Americans. He also responded to segregation by opening a country club, a golf course and an oceanfront recreational area that welcomed a non-white clientele. He assisted Booker T. Washington in the creation of the national Negro Business League, and supported historically black colleges. He is interred with his first wife, Mary Sammis Lewis (1865-1923).

References

External links
 Duval County listings at National Register of Historic Places
 Florida's Office of Cultural and Historical Programs
 Duval County markers
 Lewis Mausoleum

Buildings and structures in Jacksonville, Florida
History of Jacksonville, Florida
National Register of Historic Places in Jacksonville, Florida
Northside, Jacksonville
African-American history in Jacksonville, Florida